The 1999 Phillips 66 Big 12 men's basketball tournament was the postseason men's basketball tournament for the Big 12 Conference. It was played from March 4–7 at Kemper Arena in Kansas City, Missouri. No. 3 seed Kansas defeated  53–37 to win the championship and receive the Big 12's automatic bid to the 1999 NCAA tournament.

Seeding
The Tournament consisted of a 12 team single-elimination tournament with the top 4 seeds receiving a bye.

Schedule

Bracket

All-Tournament Team
Most Outstanding Player – Jeff Boschee, Kansas

See also
1999 Big 12 Conference women's basketball tournament
1999 NCAA Division I men's basketball tournament
1998–99 NCAA Division I men's basketball rankings

References

Big 12 men's basketball tournament
Tournament
Big 12 men's basketball tournament
Big 12 men's basketball tournament
College sports tournaments in Missouri